Yang Zhichao (born 1963) is a multi-disciplinary artist who is known for his agonizingly painful performance pieces.

Biography
Yang was born in Gansu Province, China, in 1963. He graduated from the Art Department of Northwest Normal University in 1987. When he moved from rural Gansu to Beijing in 1998, he became aware of globalisation and the power it exerts over the body. Compared to rural Gansu where the body was a tool required for labour, in Beijing the body could be seen as hard-drive embellished with the products of industry. In this new environment, Yang's artistic practice began to take form. In his performance works, the artist used his body to raise social issues and how, in an age of science and technology, our bodies no longer belong to ourselves but to society and the state. His performances often involve painful acts such as surgical procedures without the use of anaesthetic. His later works still explore the same themes, but he has pulled away from his self-imposed suffering.

He has exhibited in art spaces in China and around the world. including the famous " 不合作方式 Fuck Off" show at the Eastlink Gallery, Shanghai in 2000, the Guangdong Museum of Art, Guangzhou, 2003, the Dadao Live Art Festival, Beijing, 2004, and China Live tour of eight major institutions in the UK organised by Beijing-based curator Shu Yang in 2005.

Notable works
 Planting Grass, (2000), performed in Shanghai, China, grass was inserted into the skin of the artist by nurses without anaesthetic, during the Fuck Off show at Eastlink Gallery warehouse.
 Iron, (2000), Beijing, China, saw the artist branded with his own identification number. The work evoked notions of ownership and the efforts of the state to monitor their subjects, reducing a person to a number.
 Hide, (2004) Beijing, China, incorporated the ideas of how the human body was becoming more compatible with technology than nature. Inspired by surgical procedures where body parts are replace by manufactured parts, fellow artist Ai Weiwei surgically implanted an unspecified metal object in Yang Zhichao's leg without anaesthetic. The object remains in the artist thigh, but he has no knowledge of what it actually is.
 China Red, (2005-2006), using drops of blood mixed with ink and mineral pigments, the artist created painting on silk to reflect his experience of daily life in the countries he performed the work (UK & Germany). By combining elements of his own body with the spiritual properties of traditional Chinese materials, his paintings aimed to create stories imbued with spirit and soul.
 Chinese Bible (2009), a collection of notebooks and diaries collected by the artist, mostly from Panjiayuan Market in Beijing. Dating from 1949 to 1999, the books contained the personal writing of generations of Chinese people which were used by the artist to represent the personal experiences of people during a century of political upheaval.
Love Story offers an insight into the nature of intimacy by documenting the artist's relationship with his wife. Since 1996, the artist kept a record of the times he had sex with his wife, Zhang Lan. Initially beginning as a collection of punch cards recording the time, day and length of coitus, the work grew more into an illustrated diary including information and details of other events at the time. The work began as a private project but was released to the public on the 20th anniversary of the work in 2016.

Solo exhibitions
 2015 Chinese Bible, Sherman Contemporary Art Foundation, Sydney, Australia
 2012 Art Patent Office - Yang Zhichao archives, Li-Space, Beijing, China.
 2011 Chinese Bible, 10 Chancery Lane Gallery, Hong Kong
 2009 Chinese Bible, China Art Archives & Warehouse, Beijing
 2008 Yang zhichao Works Exhibitions 1999-2008, Eastlink Gallery, Shanghai, China

Selected group shows
 2013 Parallel Lives: China/Hong Kong (with Douglas Young),10 Chancery Lane Gallery, Hong Kong
 2012 Beyond Action, Kylin Contemporary Center of Art, Beijing, China.
 2012 Living·Being, Songzhuang Art Center, Beijing, China.
 2008 Inward Gazes-Documentaries of Chinese Performance Arts, Macau Museum of Art, Macau, China
 2006 Performance Red!, Haus der Kulturen der Welt, Germany
 2005–2006 City Skin: Images of the Contemporary Metropolis, Tap Seac Gallery, Macau (2005 Dec 03 - 2006 Jan 15) & Shenzhen Art Museum, Guangdong (2006 Mar 05-2006 Apr 05);
 2005–2006 Conspire, TS1 Gallery, Beijing, China.
 2005 China Live, UK touring show, 2005 Oct 13 - 2005 Oct 28, which visited Chinese Arts Centre, Manchester; Greenroom, Manchester; Chapter Arts Centre, Cardiff; Warwick Arts Centre, Coventry; Baltic Centre for Contemporary Art, Gateshead; Bluecoat Gallery, Liverpool; Colchester Arts Centre, Colchester; Arnolfini, Bristol;Victoria and Albert Museum, London.
 2004 Dadao Live Art Festival, Jianwai SOHO, Beijing, China
 2003 Live Art Festival, Beijing, China
 2003 Distance, Guangdong Museum of Contemporary Art, Guangzhou, China
 2000 Fuck off, Eastlink Gallery, Shanghai, China

External links

Profiles
Yang Zhichao has profiles on Asia Art Archive; CFCCA Archive & Library; artsnet; artsy; Ocula; Li Space; Radio Television Hong Kong (RTHK)

Articles

See also
 Ai Weiwei
 Fuck Off (art exhibition)
 Performance art in China
 Shock art
 Shu Yang
 Transgressive art

References

Yang Zhichao
Yang Zhichao
Living people
1963 births
Chinese contemporary artists